AJ Kelly Park is a football (soccer) venue located at Kippa-Ring, Queensland, Australia. It is home to Peninsula Power.

Development

In 2006, AJ Kelly Park unveiled the upgrade of its dressing rooms and also a new disability access ramp. The construction of the ramp had taken nearly six years to be completed due to lack of funds by the Peninsula Power.  A new stand was built during the 2010/11 season to increase the capacity of the ground. The stand was built to the right of the clubhouse, in front of the ramp

References

Soccer venues in Queensland
Rugby league stadiums in Australia
Sports venues in Queensland
A-League Women stadiums